The Southwest Preparatory Conference (SPC) is an athletic conference for certain private high schools in Texas and Oklahoma. It is composed of the following schools:

The Awty International School in Houston, Texas
Casady School in Oklahoma City, Oklahoma
Cistercian Preparatory School in Irving, Texas
Duchesne of the Sacred Heart in Houston, Texas
Episcopal High School in Bellaire, Texas
Episcopal School of Dallas in Dallas, Texas
Fort Worth Country Day School in Fort Worth, Texas
Greenhill School in Addison, Texas
Hockaday School in Dallas, Texas
Houston Christian High School in Houston, Texas
The John Cooper School in The Woodlands, Texas
Kinkaid School in Houston, Texas
The Oakridge School in Arlington, Texas
St. Andrew's Episcopal School in Austin, Texas
St. John's School in Houston, Texas
St. Mark's School of Texas in Dallas, Texas
St. Stephen's Episcopal School in Austin, Texas
Trinity Valley School in Fort Worth, Texas

See also
 List of private schools in Texas
 List of private schools in Oklahoma

External links
 Southwest Preparatory Conference